Ravindra Jain (28 February 1944 – 9 October 2015) was an Indian music composer, lyricist and playback singer.  He started his career in the early 1970s by composing for several hit movies. His notable works include Chor Machaye Shor (1974), Geet Gaata Chal (1975), Chitchor (1976) and Ankhiyon Ke Jharokhon Se (1978), Nadiya Ke Paar (1982), Ram Teri Ganga Maili (1985) and Vivah (2006). He composed music for many films and TV shows including Ramanand Sagar's epic Ramayan (1987), which became iconic. He was awarded the Padma Shri, the fourth-highest civilian award of the Republic of India in 2015 for his contribution to arts.

Early life and education 
Ravindra Jain was born blind on 28 February 1944 to Pandit Indramani Jain and Kiran Jain as the third child of seven brothers and one sister. He belongs to the Jain community. His father was a Sanskrit pandit and his mother was a homemaker.

His father recognised his talent and sent him to stalwarts like G.L. Jain, Janardhan Sharma and Nathu Ram for formal education in music. At a young age, he started singing bhajans at temples.

Career 

His works include Saudagar, Chor Machaye Shor, Chitchor, Geet Gaata Chal, Fakira, Ankhiyon Ke Jharokhon Se, Dulhan Wahi Jo Piya Man Bhaye, Paheli, Do Jasoos, Pati Patni Aur Woh, Insaf Ka Tarazu, Nadiya Ke Paar, Ram Teri Ganga Maili and Henna. He extensively used Yesudas and Hemlata for singing his songs. He composed many religious albums in different Indian languages, including Bengali and Malayalam. He composed music for several television series. His music for Ramanand Sagar's Ramayana became iconic.

Some of his most popular works on TV are Shri Krishna, Alif Laila, Jai Ganga Maiya, Jai Mahalaxmi, Shree Brahma Vishnu Mahesh, Sai Baba, Jai Maa Durga, Jai Hanuman, Sankat Mochan Hanuman and Maha Kavya Mahabharat.

Personal life 
Jain was married to Divya Jain, with whom he has a son Aayushmaan. He died in Mumbai on 9 October 2015 because of multiple organ failure.

Discography

Films

Television
 Ramayana (1987)
 Shri Krishna (1993)
 Alif Laila (1993)
Jai Veer Hanuman (1995)
 Jai Hanuman (1997)
 Sai Baba (2005)
 Sankat Mochan Hanumaan (2012)
 Jai Ganga Maiya
 Jai Mahalaxmi
 Shree Brahma Vishnu Mahesh
 Jai Maa Durga
 Maha Kavya Mahabharat
 Ramayana (2008)

Awards 
He was awarded the Padma Shri, the fourth-highest civilian award of the Republic of India in 2015 for his contribution to arts. He received the Filmfare Best Music Director award for his work in Ram Teri Ganga Maili in 1985. Ravindra Jain won many other awards for his contribution to Indian music.

Legacy 
His funeral was attended by numerous celebrities including Hema Malini, Ranjit and Sooraj Barjatya. Prime minister Modi said: "He will be remembered for his versatile music and fighting spirit."

References

External links 
 

1944 births
2015 deaths
20th-century Indian composers
21st-century Indian composers
Blind musicians
Bollywood playback singers
Indian male songwriters
People from Aligarh
20th-century Indian male singers
20th-century Indian singers
21st-century Indian male singers
21st-century Indian singers
20th-century Indian Jains